Fittleworth railway station served the village of Fittleworth in the county of West Sussex in England. It was on the London Brighton and South Coast Railway's line between Pulborough and Midhurst.

The station opened some years after the line (1859) in September 1889 and closed to passengers in February 1955. Freight traffic from Fittleworth ceased in 1963 three years before total closure in 1966. The small station building remained undeveloped for many years. However it was restored and converted into a private dwelling in 1987.

References

 

Disused railway stations in West Sussex
Railway stations in Great Britain opened in 1889
Railway stations in Great Britain closed in 1963
Former London, Brighton and South Coast Railway stations